Holme-next-the-Sea is a  small village and civil parish in the English county of Norfolk. It is situated on the north Norfolk coast some 5 km north-east of the seaside resort of Hunstanton, 30 km north of the town of King's Lynn and 70 km north-west of the city of Norwich.

The village's name means 'Island' next to the sea.

For local government, the parish falls within the district of King's Lynn and West Norfolk.

Its position on the North Sea coast makes it a prime site for migratory birds in autumn. It consequently is home to two adjoining nature reserves, one owned by the Norfolk Wildlife Trust and the other by the Norfolk Ornithological Association. A pair of black-winged stilts bred at the Wildlife Trust's Holme Dunes  in 1987, raising three young.

The eastern end of Hunstanton golf links reach to Holme, and public rights of way mean that birders and golfers have learned to co-exist. It is the meeting point of the Peddars Way and Norfolk Coast Path which together form a National Trail.

It is the nearest village to Seahenge, the Bronze Age timber circle.

The parish church of St Mary was first mentioned in 1188, but the oldest remaining part of the building is the tower which dates from the fifteenth century. The main church building was demolished and rebuilt in 1888, although some memorials and an ancient stone font survive from the earlier structure. The church has a peal of five bells which are still rung, the earliest is dated 1677. In the churchyard are the graves of various members of the Nelson family, who lived at Holme House.

References

External links

 
 
Holme-next-the-Sea from origins.org/Genuki Norfolk
Holme-next-the-Sea from NorfolkCoast.co.uk
Holme-next-the-Sea village Website.

Villages in Norfolk
King's Lynn and West Norfolk
Populated coastal places in Norfolk
Civil parishes in Norfolk
Beaches of Norfolk